Anastasia Hadjivasili (born 27 February 1989), known as Natasa Hadjivasili, is a Cypriot footballer. She has been a member of the Cyprus women's national team. She is the twin sister of Dimitra Hadjivasili.

References

1989 births
Living people
Cypriot women's footballers
Cyprus women's international footballers
Twin sportspeople
Cypriot twins
Women's association footballers not categorized by position